The 2017–18 FC Akhmat Grozny season was the ninth successive season the club played in the Russian Premier League, the highest tier of association football in Russia, and their first as Akhmat Grozny. On 7 June 2017, the club announced the name change from Terek Grozny to Akhmat Grozny, in celebration of Akhmad Kadyrov.

That season, Akhmat Grozny also took part in the Russian Cup, losing 3–0 to FC Yenisey Krasnoyarsk in the third round.

Season events
At the end of the 2016–17 season, Oleg Kononov was appointed the new manager of Akhmat Grozny. On 30 October 2017, Kononov resigned as manager, with Mikhail Galaktionov taking over in a caretaker capacity the same day, before being appointed the club's permanent manager on 14 December 2017. Galaktionov himself resigned as manager on 7 April 2018, with Igor Lediakhov being appointed as the club's caretaker manager.

Transfers

In

Out

Loans in

Loans out

Released

Squad

Out on loan

Youth squad

Friendlies

Competitions

Russian Premier League

Results by round

Results

League table

Russian Cup

Squad statistics

Appearances and goals

|-
|colspan="14"|Players away from the club on loan:
|-
|colspan="14"|Players who left Akhmat Grozny during the season:
|}

Goal scorers

Disciplinary record

References

External links

Official website 

FC Akhmat Grozny seasons
Akhmat Grozny